Håkan Andersson may refer to:

 Håkan Andersson (ice hockey) (born 1965), Director of European Scouting for the Detroit Red Wings professional ice hockey team
 Håkan Andersson (motorcyclist) (born 1945), Swedish former motocross World Champion